Toni Kukoč (born September 18, 1968) is a Croatian-American former professional basketball player who serves as Special Advisor to Jerry Reinsdorf, the owner of the Chicago Bulls. After a highly successful period in European basketball, he was one of the first established European stars to play in the National Basketball Association (NBA). Nicknamed "The Waiter", Kukoč played for four NBA teams between 1993 and 2006, winning the NBA Sixth Man of the Year Award in 1996. He is a three-time NBA champion, having won championships with the Michael Jordan-led Chicago Bulls in 1996, 1997, and 1998.

Kukoč is renowned for his versatility and passing ability. Although his natural position was small forward, the  Kukoč played multiple positions and demonstrated court vision and an outside shooting touch that were seldom found in players of his height. He also enjoyed success in international play, winning Olympic silver medals in 1988 (playing for Yugoslavia) and 1992 (playing for Croatia). Kukoč and Vassilis Spanoulis are the only players in history to receive the EuroLeague Final Four MVP honor on three occasions. He was elected to the FIBA Hall of Fame in 2017 and the Naismith Memorial Basketball Hall of Fame in 2021.

Early life
Kukoč grew up as a youth in Split, Croatia. His father was devoted to athletics, having played football as a goalkeeper in a lower ranked local club. Possessing excellent motor skills, young Toni grew up participating in different sports, including table tennis and football. He especially excelled in table tennis as an adolescent, winning different youth category titles. He soon switched to basketball as his sport of choice.

Professional career

Europe
Kukoč began playing for his home town club, KK Jugoplastika, at the age of 17. He achieved significant success during his time with the club, winning the prestigious EuroLeague as the team recorded three winning year seasons consecutively (1989–1991). His team won the Triple Crown in 1990 and 1991. Kukoč was awarded as the EuroLeague Final Four MVP both times.

Afterwards, he played for Benetton Treviso and won the Italian League championship in 1992 and the Italian Cup in 1993. He also played in the EuroLeague final in 1993, winning the EuroLeague Final Four MVP once again. He was nicknamed "the White Magic", "the Spider from Split", "the Pink Panther", "the Waiter", "Euro Magic", and "the Croatian Sensation". Throughout the 1990s, he won several European Basketball Player of the Year Awards.

Chicago Bulls
After being drafted by the NBA's Chicago Bulls in 1990, Kukoč continued to play in Europe, until finally reporting to the Bulls in 1993, when the team had just finished its first three-peat and had lost Michael Jordan to retirement. Although disappointed that he could not play with Jordan, Kukoč made his NBA debut on November 5, 1993.

The  Kukoč came off the bench in 1993–94 behind small forward Scottie Pippen and power forward Horace Grant. On January 21, 1994, in a game against the Indiana Pacers, Reggie Miller made a mid-range jumper with 0.8 seconds remaining to give the Pacers a 95–93 lead. Scottie Pippen inbounded the ball to Kukoc, who hit a three-point jumper at the buzzer to give the Bulls the win, 96–95. Kukoč put up a solid rookie season, averaging double-digit scoring and earning a berth on the NBA All-Rookie Second Team.

On May 13, 1994, at the end of Game 3 of the Eastern Conference Semifinals, the Bulls and the New York Knicks were tied at 102 with 1.8 seconds left. Bulls coach Phil Jackson designed the last play for Kukoč, with Scottie Pippen charged with inbounding the basketball. Pippen was so angered by Jackson's decision to not let him take the potential game-winner that he refused to leave the bench and re-enter the game when the timeout was over. Kukoč did hit the game-winner, a 23-foot fadeaway jumper at the buzzer, though the Bulls eventually lost the series in seven games.

After Grant left in the offseason, Kukoč moved into the starting lineup and finished the 1994–95 season second on the Bulls in scoring, rebounds and assists, behind Pippen. Furthermore, Michael Jordan would return to the Bulls in March, fulfilling Kukoč's wish to play alongside him.

For the 1995–96 season, the Bulls were bolstered by both Jordan's return to full form and the offseason acquisition of exceptional rebounder Dennis Rodman. With Pippen still at small forward, coach Phil Jackson saw it best to have Kukoč continue to be a bench player. Kukoč was third on the team in scoring (behind Jordan and Pippen) and was rewarded for his efforts with the NBA Sixth Man of the Year Award. He also assisted the Bulls to a 25-game turnaround and the best record in league history at the time at 72–10 (later surpassed by the 2015–16 Golden State Warriors), as well as the fourth championship in team history. Kukoč was the 4th and is currently the last player to win the NBA Sixth Man of the Year Award and the NBA title in the same year having joined Kevin McHale, Bill Walton, and Bobby Jones in accomplishing that feat.

In 1997 NBA Finals, the Bulls defeated the Utah Jazz in six games, during which at the end of Game 6, Kukoč received the ball from Scottie Pippen and sealed the victory with a dunk to make the score 90–86 with just 0.6 seconds left. A year later, the Bulls defeated the Jazz again in the 1998 NBA Finals. In both series, Kukoč came off the bench as the sixth man, and was the team's leading scorer off the bench.

Career ending and retirement
During the 1998–99 offseason, Jordan retired, Pippen was traded to the Houston Rockets, and Jackson was fired by the Bulls' GM Jerry Krause and took a break from coaching, effectively breaking up the Bulls' dynasty. Kukoč was the highest-scoring player from the Bulls' previous season that remained with the team.

In the lockout-shortened 1998–99 season, he led the team in scoring, rebounding, and assists. On February 16, 2000 as Chicago continued their rebuilding scheme, Kukoč was traded to the Philadelphia 76ers in a three-team deal involving the Golden State Warriors that sent Bruce Bowen, John Starks and a 2000 first-round pick to the Bulls. The following season, he was dealt to the Atlanta Hawks, along with Nazr Mohammed, Pepe Sánchez, and Theo Ratliff, in a blockbuster deal that sent Dikembe Mutombo and Roshown McLeod to the 76ers. 

After a short stint with the Hawks, he was traded to the Milwaukee Bucks, along with Leon Smith, in a deal for Glenn Robinson. During the 2003 NBA Playoffs, Kukoč averaged postseason career-highs of 14.8 points and 2.2 steals per game during a six game first round loss to the eventual Eastern Conference champion New Jersey Nets. On September 12, 2006, Kukoč announced that he would retire from professional basketball if he could not be signed by either the Milwaukee Bucks or the Chicago Bulls for the 2006–07 NBA season. Although various NBA teams had shown interest in his services, Kukoč expressed a desire to be close to his residence in the city of Highland Park, Illinois.

National team career

Yugoslavia
Kukoč was on the junior Yugoslavian Under-19 national team that won the 1987 FIBA Under-19 World Cup, where he was named the tournament MVP. He was also on the senior men's Yugoslavian national team that got the silver medal at the 1988 Summer Olympic Games. He was named the MVP of the 1990 FIBA World Championship, where he also won a gold medal. With Yugoslavia, he also won the gold medal at the EuroBasket 1989 and the EuroBasket 1991. He was also named the MVP of the 1991 EuroBasket tournament.

Croatia
Kukoč went on to win a silver medal with Croatia, at the 1992 Summer Olympic Games, in Barcelona. He also won bronze medals at both the 1994 FIBA World Championship, in Canada, and at the 1995 EuroBasket, in Greece.

NBA career statistics

Regular season

|-
| style="text-align:left;"|
| style="text-align:left;"|Chicago
| 75 || 8 || 24.1 || .431 || .271 || .743 || 4.0 || 3.4 || 1.1 || .4 || 10.9
|-
| style="text-align:left;"|
| style="text-align:left;"|Chicago
| 81 || 55 || 31.9 || .504 || .313 || .748 || 5.4 || 4.6 || 1.3 || .2 || 15.7
|-
| style="text-align:left; background:#afe6ba;"|
| style="text-align:left;"|Chicago
| 81 || 20 || 26.0 || .490 || .403 || .772 || 4.0 || 3.5 || .8 || .3 || 13.1
|-
| style="text-align:left; background:#afe6ba;"|
| style="text-align:left;"|Chicago
| 57 || 15 || 28.2 || .471 || .331 || .770 || 4.6 || 4.5 || 1.1 || .5 || 13.2
|-
| style="text-align:left; background:#afe6ba;"|
| style="text-align:left;"|Chicago
| 74 || 52 || 30.2 || .455 || .362 || .708 || 4.4 || 4.2 || 1.0 || .5 || 13.3
|-
| style="text-align:left;"|
| style="text-align:left;"|Chicago
| 44 || 44 || 37.6 || .420 || .285 || .740 || 7.0 || 5.3 || 1.1 || .3 || 18.8
|-
| style="text-align:left;"|
| style="text-align:left;"|Chicago
| 24 || 23 || 36.2 || .381 || .231 || .761 || 5.4 || 5.2 || 1.8 || .8 || 18.0
|-
| style="text-align:left;"|
| style="text-align:left;"|Philadelphia
| 32 || 8 || 28.6 || .438 || .289 || .673 || 4.5 || 4.4 || 1.0 || .3 || 12.4
|-
| style="text-align:left;"|
| style="text-align:left;"|Philadelphia
| 48 || 5 || 20.4 || .458 || .410 || .591 || 3.4 || 1.9 || .7 || .1 || 8.0
|-
| style="text-align:left;"|
| style="text-align:left;"|Atlanta
| 17 || 14 || 36.4 || .492 || .481 || .681 || 5.7 || 6.2 || .8 || .3 || 19.7
|-
| style="text-align:left;"|
| style="text-align:left;"|Atlanta
| 59 || 9 || 25.3 || .419 || .310 || .712 || 3.7 || 3.6 || .8 || .3 || 9.9
|-
| style="text-align:left;"|
| style="text-align:left;"|Milwaukee
| 63 || 0 || 27.0 || .432 || .361 || .706 || 4.2 || 3.7 || 1.3 || .5 || 11.6
|-
| style="text-align:left;"|
| style="text-align:left;"|Milwaukee
| 73 || 0 || 20.8 || .417 || .292 || .729 || 3.7 || 2.7 || .8 || .3 || 8.4
|-
| style="text-align:left;"|
| style="text-align:left;"|Milwaukee
| 53 || 6 || 20.7 || .410 || .362 || .721 || 3.0 || 3.0 || .7 || .2 || 5.6
|-
| style="text-align:left;"|
| style="text-align:left;"|Milwaukee
| 65 || 0 || 15.7 || .389 || .306 || .714 || 2.3 || 2.1 || .5 || .3 || 4.9
|- class="sortbottom"
| style="text-align:center;" colspan="2"|Career
| 846 || 259 || 26.3 || .447 || .335 || .729 || 4.2 || 3.7 || 1.0 || .3 || 11.6

Playoffs

|-
| style="text-align:left;"|1994
| style="text-align:left;"|Chicago
| 10 || 0 || 19.4 || .448 || .421 || .735 || 4.0 || 3.6 || .5 || .3 || 9.3
|-
| style="text-align:left;"|1995
| style="text-align:left;"|Chicago
| 10 || 10 || 37.2 || .477 || .438 || .692 || 6.8 || 5.7 || 1.0 || .2 || 13.8
|-
| style="text-align:left; background:#afe6ba;"|1996
| style="text-align:left;"|Chicago
| 15 || 5 || 29.3 || .391 || .191 || .838 || 4.2 || 3.9 || .9 || .3 || 10.8
|-
| style="text-align:left; background:#afe6ba;"|1997
| style="text-align:left;"|Chicago
| 19 || 0 || 22.3 || .360 || .358 || .707 || 2.8 || 2.8 || .7 || .2 || 7.9
|-
| style="text-align:left; background:#afe6ba;"|1998
| style="text-align:left;"|Chicago
| 21 || 17 || 30.3 || .486 || .377 || .645 || 3.9 || 2.9 || 1.2 || .5 || 13.1
|-
| style="text-align:left;"|2000
| style="text-align:left;"|Philadelphia
| 10 || 0 || 25.7 || .419 || .324 || .588 || 3.1 || 1.7 || 1.0 || .3 || 9.3
|-
| style="text-align:left;"|2003
| style="text-align:left;"|Milwaukee
| 6 || 0 || 30.7 || .492 || .379 || .700 || 4.2 || 3.7 || 2.2 || .2 || 14.8
|-
| style="text-align:left;"|2004
| style="text-align:left;"|Milwaukee
| 5 || 0 || 21.0 || .500 || .333 || .500 || 2.8 || .8 || .6 || .4 || 8.4
|-
| style="text-align:left;"|2006
| style="text-align:left;"|Milwaukee
| 3 || 0 || 17.7 || .571 || .625 || .500 || 1.7 || 3.0 || .3 || .0 || 7.3
|- class="sortbottom"
| style="text-align:center;" colspan="2"|Career
| 99 || 32 || 26.9 || .440 || .342 || .697 || 3.9 || 3.2 || 1.0 || .3 || 10.7

Personal life
Kukoč and his wife, Renata, purchased their Highland Park home, just after arriving in Chicago, in 1993. After undergoing hip replacement surgery in 2009, he now plays at least one round of golf daily, and won Croatia's national amateur golf championship in 2011. His son, Marin, played for Highland Park High School's varsity basketball team, and then enrolled at the University of Pennsylvania. His daughter, Stela, played college volleyball at Miami University in Oxford, Ohio.

Awards and accomplishments

KK Jugoplastika
 3× EuroLeague champion: (1989–1991)
 4× National Championship of Yugoslavia champion: (1988–1991)
 2× Yugoslav Cup winner: (1990–1991)
 2× Triple Crown winner: (1990–1991)

Benetton Treviso
 Italian League champion: (1992)
 Italian Cup winner: (1993)

Chicago Bulls
 3× NBA champion: (–)
 3× Eastern Conference champion: (–)
 3× Central Division champion: (–)

National team

Yugoslavia
 1985 FIBA Europe Under-16 Championship: 
 1986 FIBA Europe Under-18 Championship: 
 1987 FIBA Under-19 World Cup: 
 EuroBasket 1987: 
 1988 Summer Olympics: 
 EuroBasket 1989: 
 1990 FIBA World Championship: 
 EuroBasket 1991:

Croatia
 1992 Summer Olympics: 
 1994 FIBA World Championship: 
 EuroBasket 1995:

Individual
 1986 FIBA Europe Under-18 Championship: MVP
 1987 FIBA Under-19 World Cup: MVP
 3× Croatian Sportsman of the Year: (1989–1991)
 FIBA World Cup All-Tournament Team: (1990)
 FIBA World Cup MVP: (1990)
 5× Euroscar European Player of the Year: (1990–1991, 1994, 1996, 1998)
 4× Mister Europa European Player of the Year: (1990–1992, 1996)
 3× EuroLeague Final Four MVP: (1990, 1991, 1993)
 EuroLeague Finals Top Scorer: (1990)
 2× EuroLeague All-Final Four Team: (1991, 1993)
 2× FIBA European Selection: (1991 I, 1991 II)
 2× FIBA EuroBasket All-Tournament Team: (1991, 1995)
 FIBA EuroBasket MVP: (1991)
 FIBA's 50 Greatest Players: (1991)
 Franjo Bučar State Award for Sport: (1992)
 NBA All-Rookie Second Team:
 NBA Sixth Man of the Year:
 50 Greatest EuroLeague Contributors: (2008)
 FIBA Hall of Fame: (2017)
 Naismith Memorial Basketball Hall of Fame: (2021)

Filmography
 Once Brothers (2010)
 250 Steps (2017)
 The Last Dance (2020)

References

External links

Toni Kukoč at Basketball-Reference.com
Toni Kukoč at FIBA.com (archive)
Toni Kukoč at FIBAEurope.com
Toni Kukoč at LegaBasket.it 
EuroLeague & International Statistics
Toni Kukoč at NBA.com

1968 births
Living people
1990 FIBA World Championship players
Atlanta Hawks players
Basketball players at the 1988 Summer Olympics
Basketball players at the 1992 Summer Olympics
Basketball players at the 1996 Summer Olympics
Basketball players from Split, Croatia
Chicago Bulls draft picks
Chicago Bulls players
Croatian emigrants to the United States
Croatian expatriate basketball people in Italy
Croatian expatriate basketball people in the United States
Croatian men's basketball players
Euroscar award winners
FIBA EuroBasket-winning players
FIBA Hall of Fame inductees
FIBA World Championship-winning players
KK Split players
Lega Basket Serie A players
Medalists at the 1988 Summer Olympics
Medalists at the 1992 Summer Olympics
Milwaukee Bucks players
National Basketball Association players from Croatia
Olympic basketball players of Croatia
Olympic basketball players of Yugoslavia
Olympic medalists in basketball
Olympic silver medalists for Croatia
Olympic silver medalists for Yugoslavia
Pallacanestro Treviso players
People from Highland Park, Illinois
Philadelphia 76ers players
Small forwards
Yugoslav men's basketball players
1994 FIBA World Championship players